Rosalind Blauer, née Hyman, (24 January 1943 – 1973) was a Canadian economist who specialized on the effects of inflation and income distribution.

Personal life and education
Blauer was born in Montreal, Canada on 24 January 1943. She graduated with first-class honors from McGill University in 1963 and received her Master of Arts degree from the University of Rochester two years later, accompanied by her husband. They returned to McGill University where Blauer completed her Ph.D. in 1971. The Blauers adopted a son, Daniel, and Rosalind gave birth to another son, Andrew, in 1973. Shortly afterwards, she lapsed into a coma during a minor surgical procedure and died a month later.

Career
Blauer and her husband accepted faculty positions at the newly established Brock University in late 1966, where she became the founding member of the economics department. They took a leave of absence in 1972 to take positions with Manitoba's New Democratic Party government where Rosalind became the director of economic analysis in the Cabinet Policy Secretariat.

Notes

References

1946 births
1973 deaths
Canadian women economists
Canadian economists
University of Rochester alumni
Academic staff of Brock University
McGill University alumni
Academics from Montreal